Luke Moffatt (born June 11, 1992) is an American former professional ice hockey forward who last played for the Manchester Storm in the EIHL. Moffatt was drafted 197th overall by the Colorado Avalanche in the 2010 NHL Entry Draft.

Playing career
Moffatt was born in Paradise Valley, Arizona. He completed School at Pioneer High while remaining in Ann Arbor, Michigan to play junior hockey in the U.S. National Development Team Program. In his two years within the USA Hockey program, Moffatt competed in several tournaments and scored 15 points in 28 games during the 2009–10 season while in the United States Hockey League. After committing to play collegiate hockey with the University of Michigan, Moffatt was the Colorado Avalanche's last pick selected in the 2010 NHL Entry Draft, 197th overall.

In his sophomore season with the Michigan Wolverines in 2011–12, Moffatt was named to the CCHA All-Tournament Team in compiling 16 points in 40 contests. While on scholarship throughout his collegiate career he improved upon his goal scoring totals each year and in his senior season was honored by the Wolverines with the Carl Isaacson Award as the team's best student-athlete. After completing his tenure with the University of Michigan in the 2013–14 season, Moffatt was not offered a contract by the Colorado Avalanche.

As a free agent, Moffatt opted to pursue his professional abroad, signing an initial try-out contract with top level club, Frölunda HC of the Swedish Hockey League on September 3, 2015. He made the Indians opening night roster realising his professional debut to begin the 2014–15 season. After 10 games with Frölunda, registering 2 assists, his trial period ended and he was not offered an extension. On October 17, 2014, Moffatt moved to Norway, agreeing to terms for the remainder of the year with the Storhamar Dragons of the GET-ligaen. In 33 games, Moffatt established himself on the top scoring line with the Dragons and scored at better than a point-per-game with 44. Moffatt scored 14 points in 16 post-season games as the Dragons lost a Championship game 7 final to the Stavanger Oilers. Moffatt opted to continue playing in the off-season, enjoying an extended playing-holiday in Australia after agreeing to terms with the Newcastle North Stars of the Australian Ice Hockey League. He dominated in scoring with the North Stars, compiling 65 points in just 21 games.

On July 14, 2015, Moffatt continued his European venture by agreeing to terms on a one-year deal with HC Gherdëina of the Italian Serie A. Alongside fellow former Avalanche draft pick, Justin Mercier, Moffatt played on the top-line with Gherdëina, leading the Italian club with 53 points in 42 games in the 2015–16 season.

Upon leaving Italy, Moffatt continued his European career, signing as a free agent with the newly formed Chamonix-Morzine Pioneers of the Ligue Magnus on August 4, 2016.

On June 2, 2017, Moffatt's signing for Manchester Storm on a one-year basis was announced by the club. Moffatt enjoyed two seasons with the Storm, leading the club with 128 points through 113 games before opting to conclude his professional career by announcing his retirement following the 2018–19 season.

Career statistics

Regular season and playoffs

International

References

External links

1992 births
Living people
American men's ice hockey right wingers
Colorado Avalanche draft picks
Frölunda HC players
HC Gardena players
Manchester Storm (2015–) players
Michigan Wolverines men's ice hockey players
Newcastle North Stars players
Storhamar Dragons players
USA Hockey National Team Development Program players